John T. Power (14 April 1883 – 1 February 1982) was an Irish hurler who played as a goalkeeper for the Kilkenny senior team.

Power made his first appearance for the team during the 1907 championship and was a regular member of the starting fifteen for well over a decade. He made his final appearance when he was recalled briefly for the 1925 championship. During that time Power won four All-Ireland medals and six Leinster medals. He also won a Railway Shield medal with Leinster.

At club level Power played with Piltown, however, it was with Mooncoin that he won two county championship medals.

Following the death of Larry Flaherty in 1979, Power became the oldest living All-Ireland medal winner. His lifetime spanned the entire history of the Gaelic Athletic Association.

References

1883 births
1982 deaths
Hurling goalkeepers
Piltown hurlers
Mooncoin hurlers
Kilkenny inter-county hurlers
Leinster inter-provincial hurlers
All-Ireland Senior Hurling Championship winners